The following is a list of real or historical people who have been portrayed as President of the United States in fiction, although they did not hold the office in real life. This is done either as an alternate history scenario, or occasionally for humorous purposes. Also included are actual US Presidents with a fictional presidency at a different time and/or under different circumstances than the one in actual history.

C

John C. Calhoun
 In the alternate history novel The Probability Broach as part of the North American Confederacy Series by L. Neil Smith in which the United States became a libertarian state after a successful Whiskey Rebellion and George Washington being overthrown and executed by firing squad for treason in 1794, John C. Calhoun becomes the 6th President in 1831 after James Monroe dies in office. He is elected to a full term in 1832 and served as president until 1836 when he lost that year's presidential election to former president Albert Gallatin, who went on to serve as the 7th president until 1840.
 In Gertrude B. Reinman's novelette The Light in the North, President Andrew Jackson was thrown off his horse in February 1831, and died of his wounds two days later. Vice President John C. Calhoun - who was on very bad terms with Jackson, and on the verge of resigning - was catapulted to the Presidency. Knowing he had less than a year left of the Presidential term and little chance of re-election, Calhoun acted with precipitate haste to leave his mark and implement as much as he could of his political program. He started by drastically lowering the tariffs to less than half the amount established under Jackson - a measure considered helpful to Southern interests and harmful to those of the North. Then followed the "Nullification Bill" which would have enshrined in Federal Law the principle that states may "nullify" Federal Law. While that was still being hotly debated in Congress, Calhoun dropped his greatest bombshell. He proposed to add "The Slavery Amendment" to the Constitution. Its text stipulated that "Congress shall make no law abridging the Institution of Slavery", that slavery shall be legal in all new Territories and States joining the Union, and that a slave owner would be able to move to a Free State and keep there his slaves. While in fact having little chance of being ratified, this proposal was taken in the North as "a declaration of war" and aroused a secessionist ferment. An emergency conference of New England states met in Boston, adopting a fiery document modeled on the American Declaration of Independence and casting Calhoun in the role of King George III. New England was joined within weeks by the rest of the Northern states - which, however, did not declare a secession but rather asserted that they were the true United States and that Calhoun and his Southern supporters had seceded from them. Calhoun considered the option of waging war to bring back the Northerners, but discarded it after a few half-hearted skirmishes. Not only did Calhoun himself support the principle of States' Rights, up to and including the right to secession, but he realized that with the North breaking away, both the institution of slavery and Calhoun's own political position would be buttressed. Therefore, Calhoun called for "an amicable parting" and was ready to be flexible in negotiations on the modalities of separation - among other things, being ready to concede to the Northerners the name of "United States of America" while the South took the name "Columbia". However, all chances of an amicable parting were dashed by a severe crisis in Maryland. With the Maryland Legislature split down the middle, a savage local civil war known as "Bleeding Maryland" broke out. Rival militias ranged across Maryland, both sides engaging in looting, rape, arson and massacre, and with radical Abolitionists and equally fanatic adherents of slavery flocking from all over the country to join in the fray - as did numerous plain criminals, outlaws and cutthroats of all kinds. Calhoun and his Northern opponents could only watch helplessly, since the sending of regular military units from either side into Maryland might have ignited an all-out war. Finally, after the Great Fire of Baltimore reduced most of Maryland's main city to smoking ruin, the Partition of Maryland was agreed upon - a meandering and jagged new border awarding about two thirds of the embattled state to Columbia and the remaining third to the United States. Columbia held its first Presidential elections in November 1833 - with Calhoun elected by a landslide, virtually unopposed. But while reading his inauguration address, Calhoun was assassinated by Austin Bearse - a young Cape Cod sailor, radical abolitionist and Maryland veteran. Bearse  was seized by a mob, beaten up and lynched - being hanged on a lamp post within twenty minutes of having shot Calhoun. That bloody day in Washington produced two revered martyrs - Calhoun in the South, Bearse  in the North - and set the stage for many more years of conflict and enmity.

Al Capone
 Al Capone is president of the United Socialist States of America in Kim Newman and Eugene Byrne's Back in the USSA, succeeding Eugene V. Debs following his death in 1926. Capone serves as a parallel to Joseph Stalin. He is succeeded by Barry Goldwater, who is himself a parallel to Nikita Khrushchev.
 In the short story "Boss" by Mark Bourne contained in the anthology Alternate Tyrants edited by Mike Resnick, Al Capone embarks upon a political career and establishes a decades-long Mafia-like presidency in the United States.

Jimmy Carter
 In a parallel universe designated Earth-81426 featured in the comic book What If? Volume 1 No. 26 (April 1981), Jimmy Carter ran for re-election against the Republican Party candidate Ronald Reagan and the New Populist Party candidate Captain America in 1980. While he praised Captain America for his long service to the United States, he noted that the superhero had no political experience. Captain America eventually won the election and was inaugurated as the 40th President on January 20, 1981.
 In the alternate history novel The Probability Broach by L. Neil Smith in which the United States became a libertarian state known as the North American Confederacy in 1794, "Jim-Earl" Carter was a peanut farmer in Georgia in 1986.
 In the alternate history novel Russian Amerika by Stoney Compton, Jimmy Carter is hinted as being a ranking member of the Confederate States military.
 In the short story "Demarche to Iran" by Alexis A. Gilliland contained in the anthology Alternate Presidents edited by Mike Resnick, Jimmy Carter lost the 1976 election to Gerald Ford after Ford gives former president Richard Nixon a specific, rather than a general, pardon, thus keeping his popularity high enough that he reelected president when Illinois shifted from Democrat to Republican after the second recount.
 In the short story "A Dream Can Make a Difference" by Beth Meacham contained in the anthology By Any Other Fame, Marilyn Monroe survived her drug overdose on August 5, 1962 and subsequently entered politics. She was elected Governor of California in 1970, defeating her Republican opponent and fellow former Hollywood star Ronald Reagan. She later became the first female President in 1980 with Jimmy Carter as her vice president. After only 69 days in office, President Monroe was assassinated in Washington, D.C. on March 30, 1981 by John Hinckley, Jr. as the culmination of an effort to impress Jodie Foster. Carter succeeded her as President.
 In a parallel universe featured in the Sliders episode "The Young and the Relentless", Carter was defeated by Howard Stern in 1980. Stern became the 40th President at the age of 27.
 In the alternate history novel series Southern Victory novel Settling Accounts: Drive to the East by Harry Turtledove, Jimmy Carter was a sailor in the Confederate States Navy during the Second Great War (1941–1944). In late 1942, while on leave in his home town of Plains, Georgia, Carter organised the defences of that town against a surprise raid led by the Negro guerrilla leader Spartacus. His efforts proved to be unsuccessful. He was killed by Major Jonathan Moss of the United States Army, who had rendered assistance to Spartacus and his followers, in front of his mother Lillian Gordy Carter. He was 18 years old at the time of his death.
 In the book The 80s A Look Back by Tony Hendra, Christopher Cerf, and Peter Elbling, a satire book published in 1979, Ted Kennedy wins the 1980 Democratic Party presidential primaries, and Jimmy Carter agrees to serve as Vice President. They win the election after Kennedy promises Southern Senator Russell Long anything for his support, and reaches out to suburban voters by appointing Allan Bakke Surgeon General. However, when Long needs a liver transplant Bakke gives him Kennedy's only afterwards say "Now I remember, it's one liver and two kidneys." President Kennedy resigns due to health reasons five days into his term, and Carter becomes President again. In 1984 Carter runs for the House of Representatives and is elected speaker. Republican Senator William Roth and Congressman Jack Kemp are elected President and Vice President on a promise to cut taxes. This leaves no money for their salaries, and both resign making Carter the president again.
 In the story "Is he a peacemaker?" by Tom Rosen, a power struggle in the leadership of the newly-founded Islamic Republic of Iran results in Khomeini ordering the radicals to evacuate the US Embassy in Teheran and release the American diplomats held hostage there, in exchange for a secret American promise to restrain Saddam Hussein of Iraq from any hostile move against Iran. President Carter, welcoming the released hostages in the White House, gains credit for this diplomatic coup and is easily re-elected in 1980. Carter's second term is characterized by an intensive involvement in the Middle East and an effort to achieve an end to the Israeli-Palestinian Conflict. This brings Carter into a head-on collision with Israeli Prime Minister Menachem Begin and Begin's Defense Minister Ariel Sharon, with Carter demanding in June 1982 that Israel stop a planned invasion of Lebanon, followed by the US recognizing the PLO and demanding that Begin enter negotiations with Yasser Arafat - which Begin rejects out of hand. With Israeli opposition leaders Shimon Peres and Yitzhak Rabin supporting Carter's demands, the President is accused of interfering in Israeli internal affairs. Later, Begin and Sharon escalate the confrontation, explicitly accusing Carter of being an "Anti-Semite" and attempting to mobilize American Jews against him. Nevertheless, most American Jews retain their traditional allegiance to the Democratic Party and significantly help Walter Mondale's elections victory in 1984. In his inauguration speech Mondale promises to "de-escalate the war of words with Israel" while "continuing unflinchingly the effort to achieve peace in the Middle East, to the great benefit of Israelis, Palestinians and everybody else there".

Lewis Cass
 The second alternate history scenario in David Holberg's "The United States as It Could Have Been" posits that in December 1860 Secretary of State Lewis Cass becomes alarmed at the growing secessionist sentiment and at what Cass considers President James Buchanan's failure to protect federal interests in the South and his failure to mobilize the federal military. Cass considers resigning in protest - but before he could do so, Buchanan and his Vice President John Breckinridge both die in a fire breaking out in a boat on the Hudson. Under the order of succession, the Secretary of State - old and not in the best of health - is catapulted to the Presidency for a crucial few months. Immediately upon assuming office Cass proceeds to mobilize the army and threatens to use it against "Anyone threatening the Union" - the threat endorsed by President-Elect Abraham Lincoln. Lincoln arrives in Washington and with Cass' consent assumes in practice much of the Presidential power, months before his formal inauguration. The mobilization and Presidential bellicose posture have the effect of deterring some of the would-be-secessionists; especially, Virginia opts to remain in the Union. Seven states, mostly from the Deep South, do proceed to secede soon after Lincoln's inauguration. With Virginia remaining in the Union, the Virginian Robert E. Lee accepts Lincoln's offer to assume command of the US Army charged with the ending the secession. By late 1862, Lee's troops are in virtually complete control of the rebellious States' territory and only final mopping up left to do, and the First American Civil War seems over. Lincoln announces that "for the time being" the institution of slavery will remain in force: "I have said at the outset and say so again at the end: this war was fought to preserve the Union, not to abolish slavery. Slavery may be evil, but the way to abolish it is not by the sword!" Angry and bitter Abolitionists, feeling betrayed, proceed to assassinate both Lincoln and Lee, instigate slave rebellions in Louisiana and Alabama with the tacit support of Abolitionist-infiltrated Federal garrisons, and seize large parts of New England in an act of "conditional secession" - they would accept Federal authority only after slavery had been abolished. President Hannibal Hamlin, taking up after the assassination of Lincoln, vows that "This second threat to the Union would be dealt with by an Iron Fist - just as the first was". Federal troops in South have to fight on two fronts, both against the rebellious slaves and Abolitionist mutineers and against resurgent pro-slavery secessionists trying again. By 1864, the Second American Civil War is over, with Federal authority restored North and South after General Sherman's troops burned down Boston, Concord and other Abolitionist-held cities and towns. Hamlin, deeply hated, has no chance to win re-election, and the country remains highly tense and unsettled; slavery would only be abolished after the Third Civil  War (1867-1872), the most bloody and destructive of the three. On his deathbed, ex-President Cass states: "My conscience is clear. When I ordered that mobilization, I did my duty as a saw it, and would do it over again".

Anton Cermak
 In Barbara Newman's short story Next Year in Prague, the Czech-born Anton Cermak survives an assassination attempt in 1933 and several later attempts in the following years, and goes on to serve for several terms as Mayor of Chicago. Cermak wages a relentless war against the city's notorious gangsters, with the Mayor taking a personal part in police raids, at a considerable risk to life and limb. Following Al Capone being found guilty on seven charges of murder and executed in 1938, Cermak becomes a highly popular national figure, and a strong Congressional lobby embarks on amending the Constitution in order to enable foreign-born candidates to assume the Presidency. The "Cermak Amendment" is enacted in time for Cermak to become Franklin D. Roosevelt's running mate in the 1944 election, and he becomes President following Roosevelt's death in 1945. In 1948 President Cermak takes a personal interest in the affairs of his European homeland. Following the Czechoslovak coup d'état conducted by the Czechoslovak Communists, Cermak sends a highly threatening letter to Joseph Stalin, bringing Europe to the verge of World War III. The crisis is defused through an emergency summit between Cermak and Stalin, held in the Prague Castle. At the conclusion, Cermak makes a speech in Czech to cheering crowds at Vaclav Square, informing them  that Stalin had agreed to the holding of democratic elections under international supervision, Czechoslovakia to become a neutral state concluding no military alliance with any power. However, a week later Cermak's opponents in Congress reveal a secret article in the Cermak-Stalin Agreement, whereby Cermak agreed in exchange to the Unification of Korea under Communist rule - fulfilled in July 1948 with North Korean forces entering Seoul unopposed with tacit American consent, Syngman Rhee and his aides fleeing to the US. Cermak's policies become highly controversial: he is praised by some as Czechoslovakia's Savior while condemned by others for his "Pact with the Devil" and "The selling out of Korea". The election campaign in 1948 degenerates into fistfights and violent confrontations between Cermak's supporters and opponents. Finally, Cermak is elected to a second term in a highly contested election, by the narrowest possible margin, and seems headed for a very stormy four years in the White House.

Dave Chappelle
 President in a sketch on Chappelle's Show In the "real" version of Deep Impact, Chappelle reveals that America has the cure for AIDS, has mastered cloning, and has made contact with aliens, who then take him to safety on their spaceship. Unfortunately, President Chappelle went missing during his third term and was subsequently replaced by Vice President Charlie Murphy.

Dick Cheney
 Becomes the 44th President after the assassination of George W. Bush in the 2007 British film by Gabriel Range Death of a President. As President, Cheney uses the possible al-Qaeda connection of the suspected assassin to push his own agenda, calling for "PATRIOT Act III", giving government agencies increased investigative powers on US citizens and others.
 Dick Cheney becomes the 44th President after the impeachment of George W. Bush in the final episode of the short-lived comedy series That's My Bush!.

Frank Chodorov
 In the alternate history novel The Probability Broach as part of the North American Confederacy Series by L. Neil Smith in which the United States became a Libertarian state after a successful Whiskey Rebellion and George Washington being overthrown and executed by firing squad for treason in 1794, Frank Chodorov is chosen by the Continental Congress as H. L. Mencken's successor after he is killed in a duel in 1933. He would serve as the 20th President of the North American Confederacy from 1933 to 1940.

Winston Churchill
 President in For the Sake of England by Richard K. Burns. Churchill was born in Brooklyn, New York after his pregnant mother Jennie Jerome quarreled with and separated from her English husband Lord Randolph Churchill, shortly after their marriage in 1874. Was brought up by his mother and her second husband, an American millionaire, but spent some holidays with his father in England and took pride in being descended from an aristocratic family. Had a checkered journalistic, military and political career. As a Congressman, he shifted between the Democrats and Republicans. He was elected President as a Democrat in 1936 with Franklin D. Roosevelt as his running mate, defeating the incumbent Herbert Hoover. In 1941, he intervenes World War II after Nazi Germany treacherously attacks the United Kingdom despite a peace treaty signed by Lord Halifax after the Battle of France. President Churchill faces impeachment proceedings for having started a war without Congressional approval, but survives and carries the war through to victory. Having signed a non-aggression treaty with Japan in order to concentrate US forces on the European front, Churchill sees American forces enter Berlin in September 1944 and capture Adolf Hitler, and two months later wins a third term by a landslide.

Henry Clay
 In the alternative history novel 1824: The Arkansas War by Eric Flint, Henry Clay wins the heavily contested 1824 presidential election when it is thrown into the House of Representatives against Andrew Jackson. Clay forms a political alliance with William Crawford and John C. Calhoun while John Quincy Adams supports Andrew Jackson. Clay had engineered a conflict against the independent Arkansas Confederacy (a nation of voluntarily transplanted southern Indian nations and free Negroes) by secretly and illegally arming a freebooter expedition led by Robert Crittenden that was intended to (and did) fail miserably.

Grover Cleveland
 In the short story "Patriot's Dream" by Tappan Wright King contained in the anthology Alternate Presidents edited by Mike Resnick, Samuel J. Tilden defeated Rutherford B. Hayes in 1876 and went on to be re-elected in 1880. He eventually founded the Liberal Party. Tilden's vice president was General Winfield Scott Hancock, who went on to be elected President himself in 1884 and 1888 with Cleveland as his vice president. Cleveland received the Liberal Party's presidential nomination in 1892, which he was widely expected to win. His running mate was Susan B. Anthony.
 In the short story "Love Our Lockwood" by Janet Kagan in the anthology Alternate Presidents edited by Mike Resnick, Grover Cleveland lost the 1888 election to Belva Ann Lockwood, who became the 23rd President as well as the first woman to hold the office. In 1892, Cleveland defeated Lockwood and became the 24th President. He had previously been the 22nd President from 1885 to 1889.

Bill Clinton
 In an alternate timeline featured in Branch Point by Mona Clee, Bill Clinton lost his bid for re-election in 1996 to George Wallace, who became the 43rd President. The novel was published in January 1996, indicating that the author may have believed that Clinton would lose that year's presidential election.
 In the alternate history short story "Hillary Orbits Venus" by Pamela Sargent, Bill Clinton was elected President in 1992 and 1996. His two immediate predecessors were John Glenn and Bob Dole. His vice president was Newt Gingrich, who had a reputation as a hatchet man for the President. Clinton was married to the former actress Mary Steenburgen Clinton, who had given up for her burgeoning acting career to serve as her husband's adviser and campaign manager. In 1979, she starred in the science fiction film Time After Time, in which Malcolm McDowell played H. G. Wells. At the time, it was rumored that Mrs Clinton and McDowell had had an affair.
 In Amelia Wheeler's novelette "We will not allow him to live!", a cabal of ultra-conservative Evangelicals - frustrated by the Senate's failure to impeach Bill Clinton and determined that such an "immoral man" must not be allowed to "go on contaminating the White House" - manage to infiltrate the United States Army. A powerful car bomb kills President Clinton, Vice President Al Gore and several other leading Democrats who were next on the order of succession. The conspirators then attempt to seize the White House, but are bloodily repulsed and decimated by a loyal military units. The US is plunged into a vicious civil war, with all emerging leaders of the Democratic and Republican parties being swiftly assassinated. Finally, leadership of the Democratic Party militias is assumed by the charismatic Donald Trump, who emerges as leader of the party's Radical Progressive wing, promising "a New Era of Social Justice for All Americans" and "The Crushing of the Republican Party of Despicable Assassins". Though many doubt his sincerity and though accused of being "A Socialist" and "Marxist Revolutionary", Trump manages to hold on in the White House and defeat various attempts to eject him.

Chelsea Clinton
 Is the President of the United States by 2049 on Zenon: Girl of the 21st Century. She is never actually seen on screen. Chelsea Clinton would be 69 years old by the year this movie takes place.
 Is the President of the United States in 2021 in the comic book series Liberality For All.
 In an underground chain of comic emails called "2043 – Headlines of the Future", Chelsea Clinton is president and bans all smoking, at the same time Fidel Castro dies at age 112 (Castro in real life died at the age of 90 on November 25, 2016), meaning Americans would otherwise have been able to legally buy Cuban cigars. Also in the list of jokes, "George Z. Bush" (intended to be a futuristic descendant of George W. Bush and George H. W. Bush) says he will run in the 2044 election.

Dewitt Clinton

George Garley's novel "The Canadian Enemy" is set in an Alternate Twentieth Century in which Canada is much stronger than in actual history, is in control of the whole of the Great Lakes and having both  Detroit and Chicago as major Canadian cities, and with constant tensions and bickering between the US and Canada being exploited by the Soviet Union during the Cold War. In the backstory recounted in the third chapter is it told that in the Presidential Elections of 1812, the most closely contested until then, Dewitt Clinton carried Pennsylvania and thereby won the Presidency against James Madison. Having been strongly supported by anti-war forces, upon election Clinton sent diplomatic feelers to the British, seeking to terminate the War of 1812 in whose initial year American forces did not perform very well. American diplomats discreetly pointed out that a British undertaking to refrain from impressing American sailors to service in British ships would enable the President to end the war, whereupon the Royal Navy would be able to return its squadrons from North American waters back to Britain's unfinished war against Napoleon. Eventually, peace was concluded on these lines; however, Clinton had to accept that Fort Detroit and Fort Dearborn (Chicago), lost in the early phases of the war, would remain in British hands; also, the US had to confirm  Tecumseh's confederation of Native American tribes in full possession of their lands. The ending of the war brought angry reactions in the places where the war hawks were strong, and in Baltimore the President was burned in effigy. However, for most Americans the lost territories were distant frontier outposts, and "there was plenty of other land, free for the taking, elsewhere in the West". Moreover, the President blamed the losses on the previous administration which had "started an unnecessary war and went into it woefully unprepared", and asserted that, had the war continued, the US might have sustained far greater territorial losses. Most Americans accepted this view. In his own time, and for most of the 19th Century, Dewitt Clinton was regarded as a moderately successful President. However, in the 20th Century, the increasingly difficult relations with Canada retroactively made his Presidency a hotly controversial issue. In the 1960's, Americans stridently demanding that Canada give the US access to the resources of the Great Lakes argued that, had Madison been elected, the US might have continued the War of 1812 and eventually won it - and therefore, the election of Dewitt Clinton had been a disastrous setback for the US; had Madison won in 1812, Detroit would have belonged to the US and its car industry would have been an American industry rather than a Canadian one. An opposing camp pointed out that, should the Cold War turn hot, Canadian Alaska might be the first territory invaded by the Soviets, and therefore the US and Canada needed to close ranks and avoid divisive quarrels. These tended to praise Dewitt Clinton for having  ended an unnecessary war and freed British warships to the task of defeating the tyrant Napoleon.

Hillary Clinton
 In a parallel universe featured in the Sliders Season One episode "The Weaker Sex" in which women held the positions of power and influence and men were treated like second class citizens, Hillary Clinton (played by Teresa Barnwell) was the incumbent President in 1995. Her husband, Bill Clinton, was the First Gentleman.
 Described in John Birmingham's Axis of Time novels as being an "uncompromising" president; served two terms and was martyred by a suicide bomber. A George W. Bush-class aircraft carrier, the U.S.S. Hillary Clinton (aka "The Big Hill", ship's motto "It Takes A Carrier"), was named for her.
 Portrayed as 46th president in the British comic 2000 AD (in the 1995 story Maniac 6). Ross Perot is her Secretary of State and Colin Powell her Chief of Staff.
 In the parallel universe depicted in the comic book newuniversal by Warren Ellis, Hillary Clinton was President in 2006. In this universe, the September 11, 2001 attacks never took place.
 In The Trial of Tony Blair, she was elected as the 44th President in 2008, succeeding George W. Bush.
 In The Execution Channel by Ken MacLeod, Hillary Clinton was elected as the 44th President in 2008, succeeding Al Gore. Gore had defeated George W. Bush in the 2000 election and was re-elected in 2004. The point explicitly made by the writer is that – with the September 11, 2001 attacks still happening with a Democrat in the White House – Gore and his successor Clinton would have undertaken an aggressive "War on Terrorism" similar to that undertaken by George W. Bush in actual history, leading to an unstable, oppressive situation in the later part of the 21st century when the plot is set.
 In the alternate history novel 11/22/63 by Stephen King, Hillary Clinton was President in 2011 in the alternate timeline created by Jake Epping's prevention of the assassination of John F. Kennedy. She was first elected in 2004 after her husband Bill, the widely-seen shoo-in for the Democratic nomination, died of a heart attack at that year’s national convention. Her presidency sees Maine become a province of Canada after a referendum held in 2005. Harry Dunning describes her presidency as 'not bad' but seriously hampered by constant earthquakes resulting from the temporal disruption caused by Epping.
 In the Not the White House Correspondents' Dinner TV special of Full Frontal with Samantha Bee, one segment shows host Samantha Bee watching a clip purported to come from a parallel universe where Hillary Clinton was elected as the 45th President in 2016, defeating Donald Trump. the segment, titled Woman in the High Castle (the title is a spoof of The Man in the High Castle based of the book of the same name, both use the concept of a parallel universe as a major plot point) features Bee watching the clip which revealed as footage of her alternate universe self hosting that universe's 2017 White House Correspondents' Dinner (the real Dinner occurred on the same date as the air date of the special) and as traditional for a host during the Dinner, the alternate universe Bee entertains the invitees by staging a comedy routine spoofing incumbent President Hillary Clinton (the incumbent President is traditionally expected to attend the dinner (which as the case in Woman in the High Castle) and takes the jokes about him/herself in good humor and later on, go up onto the stage him/self to make more jokes). The winner of the 2016 election in reality, Donald Trump did not attend any of the White House Correspondents' Dinners held during his Presidency (including the 2017 one) as he was unpopular with many of the White House Correspondents over not only his policies in office but uniquely also his general persona which many considered abhorrent. Trump was invited every year he was in office but never went as he considered the comedians performing as "mocking" him. 
 In the novel Agency by William Gibson, Hillary Clinton defeats Donald Trump in the 2016 election.

George Clooney
 George Clooney is a former president in the episode "The Suite Smell of Excess" of The Suite Life of Zack & Cody. Zack and Cody Martin traveled to an alternate universe where everything had changed from their original world and where President Clooney was depicted on the quarter.

Schuyler Colfax
 Jane Cobbler's story "Reconstruction Forever!" begins in October 1871, when President Ulysses Grant suspended Habeas Corpus in part of South Carolina and sent Federal troops to enforce the law there, in order to break up the Ku Klux Klan. While the operation was proceeding, Grant was assassinated on November 4, 1871, by five Klanmen who had infiltrated Washington, D.C., dressed as manual laborers, pulled pistols and shot down the President, crying out "Sic Semper Tyrannis!" (as did Booth during the Assassination of Abraham Lincoln over six years earlier). Vice President Schuyler Colfax succeeded  to the Presidency and was inaugurated in an atmosphere of extreme tension, surrounded by massed troops and flanked by senior military officers and by Black leaders from the South. In his landmark inauguration speech, Colfax vowed "Not to let the criminals benefit by their heinous deed! To hold on tenaciously and unflinchingly to the noble policy of Reconstruction, for which my great predecessor had given his life! To double and redouble the number and armament of Federal troops stationed in the territory of the former Rebels, so as to drive out of their minds the least fleeting thought of a new Rebellion! To keep Our Loyal Troops at their task there in the South, as long as their presence is needed to ensure that our new fellow citizens, freed from Vile Bondage, take their full and righteous place in the all the Councils of America! And if the task last a hundred years – so be it! Our hand shall not falter!" Colfax  was re-elected by a landslide in 1872, his election campaign centering on "The Martyrdoms of Lincoln and Grant" and asking the voters to give him a mandate as "A  Humble Follower in the Footsteps of These Two Giants". In September 1872, during the Presidential election, the New York Sun asserted that the President  was involved in the Crédit Mobilier scandal – but Colfax refused to answer the charges, calling them a "baseless and ugly calumny" and being nevertheless victoriously elected two months later.  Several times during his second term, opponents of Colfax's Southern policy tried to revive the Crédit Mobilier scandal – but in vain. The election of 1876 were more difficult for Colfax, overshadowed by several large violent outbreaks in the South. Nevertheless, Colfax did achieve election for a third term, defeating both challenger Rutherford B. Hayes in the bid for the Republican nomination and Democrat Samuel J. Tilden in the general elections – by a narrow but unequivocal majority. However, two months later – while consulting with military officers and Congressional leaders about a new campaign in the South – Colfax died suddenly of a heart attack, brought on by overwork, not enough rest and walking from the White House to Capitol Hill under adverse weather conditions. Supporters regarded him as "Yet Another Martyr for the Great Cause", opponents as "A Tyrant the Country is Well Rid Of". For better or worse, Reconstruction and military presence in the South, lasting well into the Twentieth Century, were Colfax's undoubted  heritage, ensuring his long-lasting reputation as one of the most important and influential among American Presidents. In later decades, there were again and again outbreaks of bloody violence in the South, but the often threatened Second Civil War never quite broke out. The US was too preoccupied by this prolonged internal crisis to intervene in the European Great War which broke out in 1914, dragged on until January 1920 and ended in an inconclusive "Peace of Total Mutual Exhaustion" - which endured for the rest of the 20th Century and beyond. (Adolf Hitler, an obscure failed agitator, died as a homeless drunk in Munich). Inspired by the Europeans' example, the Americans at last pulled the Federal garrisons from the South in 1926 and declared Reconstruction to be completed – and to many people's surprise, it turned out that all but marginal groups of Southern Whites have become reconciled to Black equality.

Calvin Coolidge
 In the short story "Fighting Bob" by Kristine Kathryn Rusch contained in the anthology Alternate Presidents edited by Mike Resnick, Calvin Coolidge lost the 1924 election to the Progressive Party candidate Robert M. La Follette, Sr. La Follette entered office as the 31st President on March 4, 1925. However, his term in office proved to be short-lived as he died on June 18, 1925 (as he did in real life). Burton K. Wheeler succeeded him as the 32nd President.
 In the alternate history novel series Southern Victory novel American Empire: The Center Cannot Hold, Calvin Coolidge was a Conservative Democratic politician in the early 20th century. He served as the Governor of Massachusetts in the 1920s and was elected to the presidency in 1932. He was the only man elected President of the United States to have never been inaugurated. A veteran of the Great War (1914–1917), Coolidge rose to prominence during his tenure as Governor of Massachusetts. In 1928, he was the Democratic Party's nominee for president. However, as United States had been immensely prosperous under the administration of Socialist President Upton Sinclair, Coolidge was readily portrayed as another regressive Democrat. Despite Coolidge's promises to keep the Confederate States of America in check, his lack of accomplishment outside of Massachusetts worked against him. Although he carried all six of the New England states (including his home and birth states of Massachusetts and Vermont), Kansas, Kentucky, Montana, Idaho, Nevada, and Houston (which split off from Texas after the Great War), he was defeated by the incumbent Vice President, Socialist Hosea Blackford by a narrow margin. When Coolidge called Blackford to concede, however, he expressed his belief that the bull market would not last, and that Blackford would face a difficult presidency when it finally crashed. History proved Coolidge correct. The stock market crash came a year into Blackford's term. Blackford struggled unsuccessfully with the resulting depression, but the American people's faith in him and his party quickly eroded. Further sinking Blackford's presidency was the Pacific War with Japan, which broke out in 1932, just before elections. Against this backdrop, the Democrats nominated Coolidge as their candidate for a second time in 1932. Coolidge's platform of discontinuing Blackford's costly and ineffective economic programs and a vigorous prosecution of the Pacific War handily won him and his running mate Herbert Hoover the election. Unfortunately, Coolidge did not live to take office. President-elect Coolidge was in Washington, D.C. when he suffered a heart attack while shaving and died on January 5, 1933 (the same date as he died in real history). Coolidge's term was served by Hoover, who became the 31st President.

James M. Cox
 In the short story "A Fireside Chat" by Jack Nimersheim in the anthology Alternate Presidents edited by Mike Resnick, James M. Cox was elected President in 1920 after his Republican opponent Warren G. Harding died of a stroke. Before taking office, however, President-elect Cox was assassinated by an anti-League of Nations activist. Consequently, Vice President-elect Franklin D. Roosevelt was inaugurated as the 29th President on March 4, 1921.
 In the novelette "A World at Peace" by Arnold Weinbaum, during the 1920 presidential election the Democrat candidate James M. Cox seemed on the verge of a crushing defeat. However, during the campaign the opposing candidate Warren G. Harding rejected the blackmail attempt of his former mistress Carrie Fulton Phillips. Republican party officials tried - without Harding's knowledge - to hire assassins to kill her. The attempt failed, with Phillips severely wounded but surviving. Three weeks before the elections, Phillips released to the press hundreds of love letters which Harding had written to her, many on Senate stationery, and also disclosed the fact that during WWI she had taken a pro-German stance and tried to blackmail Harding into opposing the US entry into the war. The revelations totally and irrevocably wreaked Harding's campaign, as well as his marriage. Two weeks before the elections he announced his withdrawal. It was too late for the Republicans to find a credible alternate candidate, and Cox won by a landslide, the Democrats also gaining a large majority in both Houses of Congress. With the Republicans in disarray, Cox saw his way to implement decisive political steps at the very outset of his term. In foreign policy he took the United States into membership of the League of Nations and inaugurated a policy of active American involvement in European affairs in order to promote peace and stability and prevent a new big war. In internal affairs he inaugurated a series of Progressive social and economic reforms. Though the Republicans later rallied and presented a strong challenge in the 1924 elections, Cox was re-elected and continued pursuing his policies, and in 1928 his Vice President Franklin Roosevelt was elected to continue these policies. As a result of these policies, the 1929 economic crisis was much less severe than it could have been, its effects were overcome by late 1930, and it was hardly felt outside the United States. in Germany the Weimar Republic survived a period of instability; Adolf Hitler and his National Socialist Party remained a marginal force in German politics. In the Soviet Union, the internal power struggle of the Communist Party ended with Nikolai Bukharin winning leadership and gaining complete power, inaugurating a period of gradual Liberalization and easing some of the regime's most oppressive measures - while Bucharin's defeated rival Joseph Stalin was demoted and made the secretary of the Communist Party branch in his hometown Gori, Georgia. In 1948, the thirtieth anniversary of the end of the Great War was celebrated worldwide and Cox's role in preventing a second such war was widely recognized. By general acclaim it was decided to add his face to those of the Presidents commemorated on Mount Rushmore.

Davy Crockett
 In the short story "Chickasaw Slave" by Judith Moffett in the anthology Alternate Presidents edited by Mike Resnick, Davy Crockett is elected as the 7th President in the 1828 presidential election after Andrew Jackson's image was tarnished by a land-dealing scandal. This later results in the Civil War occurring over the Compromise of 1850 and a different version of the Confederacy winning its independence in 1853.

Mario Cuomo
 Mario Cuomo is portrayed in the British comic 2000 AD (in the 1993 story Maniac 5) as vice president to President Al Gore, and succeeds to the presidency when Gore is killed by aliens during the Fourth World War. Cuomo is pressured by his advisers into taking drastic measures to win the war, against his better judgment, and shoots himself in remorse. His successor is seen but not named.
 Mario Cuomo is also President in the Stoney Compton novel Russian Amerika, although the US in that book is limited to New England, the Mid Atlantic States, and the Upper Midwest and the capital is Columbus, Ohio.

George Armstrong Custer
 In the alternate history short story "How the South Preserved the Union" by Ralph Roberts in the anthology Alternate Presidents edited by Mike Resnick, George Custer was elected President in or prior to 1888. He is named as the victor at the Battle of the Little Big Horn (June 25–26, 1876).
 In the novel "1882: Custer in Chains" by Robert Conroy, George Custer survives and wins the Battle of Little Big Horn. As a result, he is eventually elected President in 1880 and provokes a war with Spain after a group of Americans on a ship headed for Cuba in massacred.
 Much like in "1882: Custer in Chains" above, in the short story "Bloodstained Ground" by Brian Thomsen in the anthology Alternate Generals edited by Harry Turtledove, Roland J. Green and Martin H. Greenberg, George Custer survives and wins the Battle of Little Big Horn with him eventually being elected as the President of the United States, only to later be assassinated. Following Custer's death, journalist Samuel Clemens is assigned to write a memorial, but his interviews with Custer's nephew Henry Armstrong Reed and Captain Marcus Reno reveal some sickening facts about Custer.

D

Howard Dean
 The Unbreakable Kimmy Schmidt episode "Sliding Van Doors" includes a scene in an alternate 2007 where Howard Dean is president and The Purge is legal.

James Dean
 In Catherine Barnes' story "The Rebel Found A Cause", actor James Dean survived his road accident in 1955 and continued a successful film career. He moved leftward politically during the Vietnam War but did not consider running for office until 1984. In that year's campaign, a secret conclave of Democratic Party pundits concluded that none of the existing candidates had a chance to defeat incumbent Ronald Reagan, and that in order to win the party needed "its own  actor". Entering late the primaries, Dean swept Super Tuesday, gained the Democratic nomination and easily won several debates with Reagan, who looked old and tired. Dean later defeated Reagan that November. As President Dean was confronted with Mikhail Gorbachev's Perestroika policies. Warming to the Soviet leader's efforts, President Dean instructed the CIA to "watch over Gorbachev". This resulted in Dean giving Gorbachev an advance warning of an impending coup, which the Soviet leader's own security services failed to warn off, and which was averted thanks to the American warning. After Gorbachev was forced to accept the dissolution of the Soviet Union, Dean got the post-Soviet Russia accepted as a NATO member and influenced its adhesion to the European Union, whose name was changed to Eurasian Union. This, Dean argued, was vital for the fostering of multiparty democracy in Russia and averting a new Cold War in the future. Following the Iraqi Invasion of Kuwait, President Dean held a dramatic summit with Saddam Hussein at Geneva, convincing him to withdraw from Kuwait by a judicious mixture of threats of war and promises of generous American financial aid. Dean's impromptu speech "My fellow Americans, the war is over. We have sustained zero casualties and both the US and Iraq are the winners" was immediately regarded as one of the Great Speeches of American history, and Dean got the Nobel Peace Prize. At the ceremony, the King of Norway said "This prize is given to James Dean, the Rebel who made Humanity's cause his own".

Jefferson Davis
 In the alternate history novel The Probability Broach by L. Neil Smith in which the United States became a libertarian state in 1794 after a successful Whiskey Rebellion and George Washington being overthrown and executed by firing squad for treason, Jefferson Davis served as the 10th President of the North American Confederacy from 1848 to 1852. He was succeeded by Gifford Swansea, who served as the 11th president from 1852 to 1856.
 In George V. Clifton's short story "Is this the Jubilee?", President James Buchanan intervenes in 1859 to prevent the execution of John Brown and his fellows at Harpers' Ferry and commutes their punishment to life imprisonment (they would be completely pardoned in 1865). Widely criticized for his act, Buchanan said "I have no love for those rascals, but this country is like a tinderbox, and these executions were the match which would have set it off". Indeed, the escalation towards civil war is slowed down, and the United States gets a respite. In 1868, Jefferson Davis runs for President as candidate of the new Reconciliation Party, with Abraham Lincoln as his running mate, on a program calling for a phased emancipation of the slaves over a ten-year period with partial compensation to their owners. The Davis-Lincoln Ticket wins considerable support in both North and South. Davis and Lincoln - using both intensive lobbying on Capitol Hill and a series of rallies to gather grassroots support - manage to get the Emancipation Bill adopted by a wide margin in January 1870, and get re-elected by a landslide in 1872, having asked for a mandate "To complete this great project". Observers conclude that the specter of an American Civil War had definitely receded.

Eugene V. Debs
 In the alternate history anthology Back in the USSA by Kim Newman and Eugene Byrne, Eugene Debs and his followers in the Socialist Party of America overthrew the oppressive regime of President Charles Foster Kane with the storming of the White House on July 4, 1917, serving as a parallel of Vladimir Lenin. He became the first President of the United Socialist States of America (USSA). After his death in 1926, he was succeeded by Al Capone, a parallel to Joseph Stalin.

Thomas E. Dewey
 In "No Other Choice" by Barbara Delaplace contained in the anthology Alternate Presidents edited by Mike Resnick, Thomas Dewey defeats a seriously ill Franklin D. Roosevelt in 1944 to become the 33rd President, and eventually decided to drop the atomic bomb on Tokyo rather than Hiroshima, leading to the deaths of eight million Japanese civilians. His vice president was John W. Bricker, though Dewey came to believe that Bricker's temperament was better suited to peacetime than wartime.
 "The More Things Change..." by Glen E. Cox, also contained in the anthology Alternate Presidents edited by Mike Resnick, tells the story of the 1948 election in reverse, with underdog Dewey eventually defeating the early overwhelming favorite, the incumbent Harry S. Truman, by playing to anti-communist fears. He therefore becomes the 34th President with Earl Warren as his vice president. The story contains a reference to the famously inaccurate banner headline "Dewey Defeats Truman". Given that it was regarded as a foregone conclusion that Dewey would lose the election, the front page headline of the Chicago Tribune on November 3, 1948 erroneously reads "Truman Defeats Dewey". The front cover of the anthology depicts a grinning Dewey proudly holding up the relevant edition of the Chicago Tribune in the same manner as Truman did in real life.
 In The Trinity Paradox by Kevin J. Anderson and Doug Beason, the well-intentioned interference of a time traveller caused the boosting of Nazi Germany's nuclear program, and New York City was devastated in June 1944 by a radioactive dust missile fired from a German U-boat – with the result that voters lost confidence in Roosevelt and Thomas Dewey won the 1944 election with John W. Bricker as his vice president. In his term, President Dewey instituted the policy of regularly using nuclear arms in whatever war the US was involved in, first against Germany and later against the Soviet Union and North Korea.
 In Harry Turtledove's Settling Accounts: In at the Death, the final novel in the Southern Victory alternate history series, Thomas Dewey was a Democrat who was elected as the 34th President in 1944 with Harry S. Truman as his vice president. Dewey rose to fame first as a prosecutor and subsequently served as the Governor of New York during the Second Great War. An able and very popular politician, Dewey became the obvious choice to challenge the incumbent Socialist President Charles W. La Follette. Despite the fact that La Follette had recently led the country to victory over the Confederate States of America and its allies in the Second Great War (1941–1944), Dewey successfully ran on a platform that the Socialists had allowed the Confederacy to regain its strength under Jake Featherston. At his inauguration on February 1, 1945, President Dewey pledged to continue US occupation of the CS with the intention of re-integrating the southern states back into the Union, even though over 82 years had passed since the Confederate States had won its independence in the War of Secession (1861–1862) with the support of the United Kingdom and France. He pledged to continue La Follette's policy of racial equality in the armed services. Furthermore, he proposed a continued partnership with the United States' traditional ally, the German Empire, to police the world and prevent the spread of superbomb technology to their former enemies, the Russian Empire and the Empire of Japan. Given that it was widely believed that Dewey would lose the election, the front page headline of the November 8, 1944 edition of the Chicago Tribune inaccurately read "La Follette Defeats Dewey". Vice President-elect Truman was photographed holding up a copy of the paper by the media. Dewey was elected at the age of 42, tying the first Socialist president Upton Sinclair (who was elected to the first of two terms in 1920, defeating the Democratic incumbent Theodore Roosevelt) as the youngest President in US history.  He was also the first president born in the 20th century whereas Sinclair was the first born after the War of Secession.
 In Franz Ferdinand Lives! A World Without World War I (2014) by Richard Ned Lebow in which neither World War I nor World War II took place, Thomas Dewey was elected in 1944 and served two terms. He was preceded by Franklin D. Roosevelt.
 In the alternate history video game Turning Point: Fall of Liberty, Thomas E. Dewey served as the 34th President of the United States after he defeated Harry S. Truman in the 1948 election. After Nazi Germany invaded the Eastern Seaboard of the United States in 1953, he and his vice president Haley resign and let Speaker of the House James Edward Stevenson become the president of a new Pro-Nazi puppet government.
 In the alternate history novella Bring the Jubilee by Ward Moore, a Confederate victory in the War of Southern Independence is generally disastrous for the United States. In domestic politics, it results in rampant corruption and the replacement of the Democratic and Republican parties with the right-leaning Whigs and the left-leaning Populists following a series of unable Democratic and Republican administrations. The Whigs accept the status quo, wishing to turn the United States into a neo-colony for the world's great powers, while the Populists wish to ameliorate the harsher aspects of the US economy such as indentureships and the clauses of the 1864 Treaty of Reading, the American-Confederate peace agreement.  The Whig candidate for the 1940 Presidential Election is Thomas E. Dewey who defeats his Populist rival Jennings Lewis, an outcome that was favoured by the Grand Army terrorist organisation due to Dewey's more predictable agenda. However, due to political corruption, the presidency has diminished in power in comparison to the House Majority Speaker.

Bob Dole
 In the alternate history short story "Hillary Orbits Venus" by Pamela Sargent, Bob Dole was elected President in 1984 and 1988. He was preceded by John Glenn and succeeded by Bill Clinton. By 1998, he and Glenn were the only living former Presidents.
 In the alternate history novel The Sky People, Bob Dole was President at the time of the first American settlement on Venus in 1982.

Stephen A. Douglas
 In the short story "How the South Preserved the Union" by Ralph Roberts included in the anthology Alternate Presidents edited by Mike Resnick, David Rice Atchison, the President pro tempore of the United States Senate and a prominent pro-slavery activist, became the 13th President following the deaths of his predecessor Zachary Taylor and Vice President Millard Fillmore in a carriage accident. Several months after President Atchison's accession, the American Civil War broke out on April 17, 1849 with the secession of Massachusetts from the Union and the Second Battle of Lexington and Concord, from which the rebelling abolitionists, who styled themselves as the New Minutemen, emerged victorious. New Hampshire and Vermont seceded shortly thereafter and were soon followed by the rest of New England, New York, New Jersey and Pennsylvania. The seceding Northeastern states banded together to form the New England Confederacy with Daniel Webster as its first and only President and the revolutionary abolitionist John Brown as the commander of its army. The war came to an end in 1855, two years after President Atchison had issued a proclamation promising that any slave who fought in the United States Army would be granted his freedom following the end of the war and that any factory slave who worked satisfactorily would be granted his or her freedom after the war and would be paid for that work from then onwards. Stephen Douglas eventually succeeded Atchison as the 14th President after being elected in 1860 and introduced the Civil Rights Act 1861 which brought an end to slavery in the United States in its entirety. The 1861 Act also declared all men, irrespective of their color, equal and granted all African American (which by then had replaced "Negro" as the preferred term for black people) men the right to vote. However, certain veterans had already enjoyed voting rights since the end of war. Several years later, the right to vote was granted to all women.
 In the short story "Lincoln's Charge" by Bill Fawcett contained in the anthology Alternate Presidents edited by Mike Resick, Stephen Douglas was elected as the 16th President in 1860. His vice president was Herschel Vespasian Johnson. Douglas is able to live longer than he did in real life, as he still alive at the end of the story and died on June 3, 1861 in reality. In the hope of avoiding warfare, Douglas attempted to reach a compromise with the Southern representatives in the Congress. The Manumission Act of 1862 was intended to preserve the Union by freeing the slaves over a period of ten years, giving everyone time to adjust. While Douglas heralded the law as another great compromise analogous to the Compromise of 1850, the Southern representatives formed the Confederate States of America and began arming for war. After the outbreak of the American Civil War in 1862, President Douglas was fearful of further provoking the South and did not introduce conscription as the Confederacy. Consequently, the professional though much smaller Union Army was overwhelmed and nearly destroyed by the Confederate States Army at Manassas Creek in Virginia in 1862. It took the United States over a year to recover from this disaster, creating a period of false peace. Although everyone in the North initially welcomed it, the false peace gave both sides time to build their armies as well as providing an opportunity for the United Kingdom to decide to support the Confederacy with the full backing of the British Empire's diplomacy and trade. Douglas continued to negotiate with the Confederacy in an attempt to reach a compromise, failing to understand that every day lost meant another victory for the South. The failed Republican candidate Abraham Lincoln accepted a commission as the commanding general of the Illinois Militia in the Union Army. General Lincoln's own commanding officer was Brigadier General Ulysses S. Grant. Lincoln believed that he would have been able to prevent the war if he had been elected or, failing that, would have shown the kind of decisive leadership of which Douglas was seemingly incapable, built a real army and crushed the Confederacy before they were able to build a large army of their own. Shortly after leading his troops into battle for the first time in 1863, General Lincoln was shot and killed by a Confederate sniper while still on horseback. Although the story ends with Lincoln's death, it is heavily implied that the Confederacy will eventually win the war with the support of the British and establish an independent nation.

Frederick Douglass
 In the alternate history novel The Probability Broach by L. Neil Smith in which the United States became a libertarian state in 1794 after a successful Whiskey Rebellion and George Washington being overthrown and executed by firing squad for treason, Frederick Douglass served as the 16th President of the North American Confederacy from 1888 to 1892.
 In Terry Bisson's novel Fire on the Mountain, John Brown's raid on Harpers Ferry succeeds and precipitates an all-out slave rebellion throughout the South. Frederick Douglass, full of remorse for not having joined the original raid, goes southward and joins Brown's growing army of rebel slaves. Brown does not survive the years of war which follow. It is Frederick Douglass along with Harriet Tubman who carry on the war to a victorious conclusion, eventually detaching the Deep South and making of it the predominantly Black nation of Nova Africa, and defeating the last ditch attempt of die hard Unionist Abraham Lincoln to raise a new army and restore Nova Africa's territory to the Union. Douglass and Tubman are remembered by posterity as respectively the Founding Father and Founding Mother of the new nation.

Michael Dukakis
 In the short story "Dukakis and the Aliens" by Robert Sheckley in the anthology Alternate Presidents edited by Mike Resnick, Michael Dukakis won the 1988 election and became the 41st President, defeating Vice President George H. W. Bush. His own vice president was Lloyd Bentsen. President Dukakis was eventually revealed to be an enemy alien attempting to infiltrate Dulce Base. "Friendly" aliens along with the Men in Black have to adjust the timeline to ensure that Bush was elected the 41st president, instead.
 In the setting for the role-playing game Shadowrun, Dukakis became the 41st President after VP George H. W. Bush was indicted in the Iran-Contra affair in 1987, thus becoming ineligible to run for the presidency in 1988. His vice-president was Lloyd Bentsen. Dukakis Lost the 1992 election to Jeffrey Lynch (R).

References

Lists of fictional presidents of the United States